Syeda Tuhin Ara Karim, known as Aupee Karim, is a National Film Award-winning Bangladeshi actress, model, architect, and dancer. Besides, she is a faculty member at School of Architecture of American International University-Bangladesh.

Education and career
Karim completed her high school studies from Bangladesh Air Force Shaheen College. She earned the degree of Bachelor of Architecture from Bangladesh University of Engineering and Technology in 2005. Later, she completed a Master of Architecture from Anhalt University of Applied Sciences in Germany.

As of 2020, she is an assistant professor of the School of Architecture at American International University-Bangladesh (AIUB).

Karim appeared as a judge on the reality television show Lux-Channel i Superstar throughout 2014.

Karim performs Kathak dance.

Personal life
Karim married Dr. Asir Ahmed in 2007. After the divorce, she married Masud Hasan Ujjal, a television producer on 2 September 2011. The second marriage also ended in May 2013. Karim then married film producer and architect Enamul Karim Nirjhar in 2016. Karim has one daughter with Enamul Karim Nirjhar.

Works

Television

Films

Web series

TV Program

Awards
National Film Awards
 Best Actress – Bachelor (2004)

Meril Prothom Alo Awards

References

External links
 

Bangladeshi female models
Bangladeshi female dancers
Bangladeshi film actresses
Bangladeshi television actresses
Bangladeshi choreographers
Bangladesh University of Engineering and Technology alumni
Bengali television actresses
Living people
People from Dhaka
Best Actress National Film Awards (Bangladesh) winners
Academic staff of the American International University-Bangladesh
Best TV Actress Meril-Prothom Alo Critics Choice Award winners
Best TV Actress Meril-Prothom Alo Award winners
1975 births